Take It to the Streets is an album by the American musician Curtis Mayfield, released in 1990 on Curtom Records. "He's a Fly Guy" first appeared on the soundtrack to I'm Gonna Git You Sucka. The album peaked at No. 59 on Billboard'''s Top R&B Albums chart.

Critical reception

The Chicago Tribune'' deemed the album "a solid return from one of Chicago's most distinguished musical sons."

Track listing

Personnel
Curtis Mayfield - guitar, keyboards, arrangements, orchestration, final mix, vocals
Gary Thompson, Tony Brown - guitar
Lebron Scott - bass guitar
Michael Brown - keyboards
Carlos Glover - drum programming
Luis Stefanell - percussion
The True Saints - backing vocals
Angela King - backing vocals
Technical
Curtis Mayfield, Nina Easton - cover concept and design
Andrew Wilson - photography

References

Curtis Mayfield albums
1990 albums
Curtom Records albums
Albums produced by Curtis Mayfield